GDU may refer to:
 Ganja State University, in Azerbaijan
 Garbage disposal unit
 Gelatin digesting unit
 Growing degree unit
 Gudu language